The Progressive Labour Party (PLP) is a political party in Sint Eustatius. The party's motto is "United together we shall stand as one".

References

Political parties in Sint Eustatius
Labour parties